Swinton Town F.C. was an English association football club based in Swinton, South Yorkshire.

History
The club was formed in the 19th century, and won both the Barnsley Minor Cup League and Sheffield Alliance championships before entering the FA Cup in 1898.

Honours
Sheffield Alliance
Champions - 1896/97
Barnsley Minor Cup League
Champions - 1895/96

Records
Best FA Cup performance: 1st Qualifying Round, 1898–99

References

Defunct football clubs in South Yorkshire
Sheffield Association League
Barnsley Association League